Jeffery Dwayne Moore (born August 20, 1956) is a former American football running back in the National Football League for the Seattle Seahawks, the San Francisco 49ers and the Washington Redskins.  He played college football at Jackson State University and was drafted in the 12th round of the 1979 NFL Draft.

References

1956 births
Living people
American football running backs
Jackson State Tigers football players
San Francisco 49ers players
Seattle Seahawks players
Washington Redskins players
People from Kosciusko, Mississippi
Players of American football from Mississippi